Brass and Bell Metal products of Kamrup are famous for their beauty and strength of form and utility. Brass is an important cottage industry, with highest concentration in Hajo, while Sarthebari is well known for its bell metal craft. 
The principal items of brass are the kalah (water pot), sarai (a platter or tray mounted on a base), kahi (dish), bati (bowl), lota (water pot with a long neck) and tal (cymbals). Gold, silver and copper too have formed part of traditional metalcraft in Kamrup, and the State Museum in Guwahati has a rich collection of items made of these metals. Gold is generally used in ornaments.

See also
 Kamrupi silk

References

Indian metalwork
Kamrupi culture
Brass